This page provides a list of 3D rendering software. This is not the same as 3D modeling software, which involves the creation of 3D models, for which the software listed below can produce realistically rendered visualisations. Also not included are general-purpose packages which can have their own built-in rendering capabilities; these can be found in the List of 3D computer graphics software and List of 3D animation software. See 3D computer graphics software for more discussion about the distinctions.

See also 
 List of computer-aided design editors
 List of 3D computer graphics software
 List of 3D animation software
 List of 3D modeling software

References

3d Rendering Software
3D graphics software
Software